Johny Tolengo, el majestuoso is a 1987 Argentine film. It had a high success, and helped the actor Juan Carlos Calabró to become a highly recognized comedian.

The character of Johnny Tolengo, a Buenos Aires socialite similar to Isidoro Cañones, was created in the TV show "Calabromas". In the movie, the character is a famous singer, dealing with extortions from the mafia. The movie released a soundtrack as well, sung by Calabró. Some songs like "Qué Alegría" or "Mis amigos los pibes" were adopted by soccer teams fans.

Cast
 Juan Carlos Calabró
 Noemí Alan
 Guillermo Francella
 Nené Malbrán
 Naanim Timoyko
 Cacho Espíndola
 Ileana Calabró
 Los Bicivoladores
 Carlos Artigas
 Mónica Guido
 José Andrada
 Gisella Paz
 Carlos Serafino
 Navarro Melvín
 Jorge López Vidal
 José María Safigueroa

References

External links
 
 Cine Nacional.com 

1987 films
Argentine adventure comedy films
1987 in Argentina
Tolengo
Tolengo
1980s Spanish-language films
Films directed by Enrique Dawi
1980s Argentine films